Thaxted railway station served the village of Thaxted, Essex. It closed in 1952.

References

External links
 Thaxted station on navigable 1946 O. S. map
 
 Photograph of engine shed 1950

Disused railway stations in Essex
Former Great Eastern Railway stations
Railway stations in Great Britain opened in 1913
Railway stations in Great Britain closed in 1952
1913 establishments in England
Thaxted